Cheonan Junction, shortly Cheonan JC, is a junction located in Dongnam-gu, Cheonan, South Chungcheong, South Korea. Gyeongbu Expressway (No. 1), Nonsan–Cheonan Expressway (No. 25), and Asan–Cheongju Expressway (No. 32) meet here. The type of junction is Y-shape junction. Asan–Cheongju Expressway will be opened, and Cheonan JC – Oksan JC segment will be overlapped with Gyeongbu Expressway and Asan–Cheongju Expressway in January 2018.

Roads

History 
23 December 2002 : It opened with Nonsan–Cheonan Expressway
January 2018 : Asan–Cheongju Expressway will be opened to traffic.

Location 
 South Chungcheong Province
 Cheonan
 Dongnam-gu
 Mokcheon-eup
 Eungwon-ri
 Samnyong-dong (Cheongnyong-dong)

References 

Gyeongbu Expressway
Nonsan–Cheonan Expressway
Asan–Cheongju Expressway
Expressway junctions in South Korea
Cheonan